Otto Rosenfeld may refer to:

 Otto Rosenfeld (aviator), German World War I flying ace, see List of World War I aces credited with 11–14 victories
 Otto Rank (1884–1939), born Otto Rosenfeld, Austrian psychoanalyst